The Andrahomana Cave is a complex of sinkholes in Andranobory (Anosy region, near Fort-Dauphin) in south eastern Madagascar.

Megafauna
It is remarkable due to the number of fossils of extinct megafauna of the island. It is were found, among other animals, fossils of giant lemur Hadropithecus stenognathus,'Tattersall I. Reconstruction of an extraordinary extinct primate from Madagascar. Proceedings of the National Academy of Sciences. 2008 Aug 5;105(31):10639-40.  (open access) pygmy hippo Hippopotamus lemerlei,  and the giant land tortoise Aldabrachelys grandidieri.''

References 

Caves of Madagascar
Sinkholes of Africa